Suca may refer to:
 Suca (lacewing), a genus of antlions in the family Myrmeleontidae
 Suca, a genus of birds in the family Sulidae, synonym of Sula

See also
 SUCA
 SucA